Nikolo-Beryozovka is a rural locality (a selo) and the administrative center of Krasnokamsky District in the Republic of Bashkortostan, Russia, located on the Kama River,  from Neftekamsk. Population:

References

Notes

Sources

Rural localities in Krasnokamsky District